Life on the Line is a 2018 medical drama produced by TVB starring Joe Ma, Matthew Ho and Moon Lau as the main leads.

The story mainly focuses on the career of ambulance personnel, as well as the fight against time in emergency situations. The show received full support from the Hong Kong Fire Services Department which assisted in filming.

Plot
Following the death of his wife, Cheung Wai-sum (Ali Lee) in a hit and run accident, Principal Ambulanceman Mak Choi-tin (Joe Ma) lives with his only daughter Mak Lok-yee (Bianca Chan), sister Mak Oi-fah (Pinky Cheung) and sister-in-law Cheung Ho-kei (Moon Lau). Young and hopeful, subordinate Cheuk Ka-kit (Matthew Ho) is impulsive and clashes with Choi-tin's life. In addition, Tam Ka-chun (Joey Law), the superior of the trainee ambulance officer, pursues perfection and picks on Ka-kit, causing the pressure on the team to greatly increase. Being the middleman, Choi-tin works hard and strives to maintain the unity and cooperation spirit between the team members. He also hopes to cultivate outstanding ambulance elites, rescuing more precious lives in challenging situations...

Cast

Cheung Sha Wan Ambulance Depot

Fire and Ambulance Services Academy (FASA)

Mak family

Cheuk family

Heung family

Other cast

Music

Awards & Nominations

TVB Anniversary Awards 2018

People’s Choice Television Awards 2018

Viewership ratings

International broadcast

References

TVB dramas
Hong Kong television series
2010s Hong Kong television series